Gabriella Cotta Ramusino (born 3 April 1942) is an Italian sprint canoer who competed in the early 1960s. She finished seventh in the K-2 500 m event at the 1960 Summer Olympics in Rome.

References

1942 births
Canoeists at the 1960 Summer Olympics
Italian female canoeists
Living people
Olympic canoeists of Italy
People from Pallanza
Sportspeople from the Province of Verbano-Cusio-Ossola